Bialystok University of Technology is the largest technical university in northeast Poland.

The beginnings of Białystok University of Technology date back to 1949, when the Private Evening College of Engineering of the Polish Federation of Engineering Associations FSNT-NOT was established in Bialystok.

Today Białystok University of Technology employs more than 620 academic educators and provides graduate courses for more than 7000 students at six faculties.

Study plans at BUT are consulted with the biggest employers in the region, and the students complete their internships and work placements in partner firms as early as during studies. A great majority of BUT's graduates find jobs within the first year after graduation.

Białystok University of Technology cooperates with many academic centres all over the world and has over 500 active bilateral agreements in scientific and educational cooperation with foreign partners (more information IRO BUT).

Białystok University of Technology has continuously been developing its scientific and teaching infrastructure. The last years were an unprecedented investment period for Bialystok University of Technology. The university gained four new facilities: the Centre for Modern Education, the Research and Education Centre of the Faculty of Electrical Engineering, the INNO-EKO-TECH Innovative Research and Education Centre for Alternative Energy Sources, Energy-efficient Construction and Environmental Protection.

University campus is located almost at the heart of the town.

History 
In 1949, Białystok, far away from its former glory, is rising from its post-war ruins. The once delightful tenement houses have burnt to ashes. The town needs to be rebuilt. The needs are enormous, the deficiencies even greater. Not only has the war deprived Białystok of its buildings but – above all – of its people, including professionals and specialists. The need to educate local engineers to rebuild the town and its former industry gives rise to the Private Evening College of Engineering in Bialystok  (Polish: Prywatna Wieczorowa Szkoła Inżynierska NOT w Białymstoku) – the present Bialystok University of Technology.

24 November 1949 - the Polish Ministry of Education issued a decision allowing for the establishment and running of the FSNT-NOT Private Evening College of Engineering in Bialystok by the Polish Federation of Engineering Associations.

1 December 1949 – FSNT-NOT Private Evening College of Engineering starts functioning. Karol Bialkowski, MSc, Eng, is appointed its first Rector. First College emblem is designed.

1950 – Faculties of Mechanical, Electrical Engineering and Faculty of Civil Engineering start teaching activities.

1951 – Provincial People's Council gives building located in Biala St. to College which is nationalised and renamed Evening College of Engineering.

1953 – Provincial People's Council gives College building and hall in Grunwaldzka St.

1954 – First 28 electrical engineers and 29 mechanical engineers graduate from Evening College of Engineering.

1964 - Machining Hall of Faculty of Mechanical Engineering is created in Grunwaldzka St. Centre for Foreign Language Teaching and Physical Education Centre are established. 1964 – Evening School of Engineering changes its name to Higher School of Engineering.

1966 - First admission to full-time studies at Faculty of Civil Engineering takes place.

1966 - Akadera Radio, first academic radio station, is founded.

1974 - Construction works of campus in the area of Zwierzyniecka, Wiejska, and Świerkowa Streets start.

19 September 1974 – Higher School of Engineering gains academic status and becomes Bialystok University of Technology.

1974 - Centre for Electronic Computation Technology (later Institute of Computer Science) is established.

1975 – Institute of Architecture with rights of Faculty is founded.

1980 - First unit of our University, Institute of Civil Engineering, is awarded right to confer PhD academic degree in technical sciences (in Environmental Engineering).

1984 - Department for Experimental Production and Technical Services at Bialystok University of Technology is founded.

1989 - Institute of Computer Science with rights of Faculty is created.

At the beginning of the 1990s, the demand for specialists (especially in IT, modern technology, and management and marketing) increased in the Polish labour market.

1993 – Department of Economic and Social Sciences is transformed into Institute of Management and Marketing (now Faculty of Management Engineering).

1994 - the Rectors of Bialystok universities signed an agreement on the construction of the BIAMAN Municipal Computer Network, the first Internet provider in Bialystok.

2001 - Faculty of Environmental Management in Hajnowka is created. Institute of Management and Marketing becomes Faculty of Management, and Institute of Computer Science – Faculty of Computer Science.

2002 - New seat of Faculty of Electrical Engineering is opened. Foundation for the Development of Bialystok University of Technology is established.

2009 - Children’ s University of Bialystok University of Technology is inaugurated.

2011 – Institute of Innovation and Technology of Bialystok University of Technology starts functioning.

2011 – Faculty of Environmental Management of Bialystok University of Technology in Hajnowka becomes Faculty of Forestry of Bialystok University of Technology in Hajnowka.

2011 – HD TV of Bialystok University of Technology starts broadcasting.

2012 – Centre for Modern Education of Bialystok University of Technology  2015 – Research and Education Centre of Faculty of Electrical Engineering is put into operation.

2015 – Innovative Research and Education Centre for Alternative Energy Sources, Energy-efficient Construction and Environmental Protection is opened.

2015 – Scientific and Research Centre of Faculty of Forestry in Hajnowka is inaugurated.

2016 – General Education Secondary School of Bialystok University of Technology is opened.

University authorities 
 University Authorities 2020-2024
Rector: Prof. Marta Kosior-Kazberuk, DSc, PhD, Eng.
Vice-Rector of Development: Prof. Mirosław Świercz, DSc, PhD, Eng.
Vice-Rector of Scientific Research: Prof. Marek Krętowski, DSc, PhD, Eng.
Vice-Rector of Education: Prof. Agnieszka Dardzińska-Głębocka, DSc, PhD.
Vice-Rector of International Cooperation: Prof. Dorota Anna Krawczyk, DSc, PhD, Eng.
Vice-Rector of Students' Affairs: Prof. Jarosław Szusta, DSc, PhD, Eng.
 University Authorities 2016-2020
Rector: Prof. Lech Dzienis, DSc, PhD, PE
Years 2016-2019:
Vice-Rector of Scientific Research: Prof. Andrzej Sikorski, DSc, PhD, Eng.
Vice-Rector of Students' Affairs: Prof. Jarosław Perszko, DSc, PhD
Vice-Rector of Development: Prof. Roman Kaczyński, PhD
Vice-Rector of Education and International Cooperation: Prof. Marta Kosior-Kazberuk, PhD, Eng.
Years 2019-2020
Vice-Rector of Scientific Research: Prof. Andrzej Sikorski, DSc, PhD, Eng.
Vice-Rector of Students' Affairs: Prof. Jarosław Perszko, DSc, PhD
 Vice-Rector of Development: Prof. Joanna Ejdys, DSc, Eng.
 Vice-Rector of International Cooperation: Prof. Marta Kosior-Kazberuk, DSc, PhD, Eng.
 Vice-Rector of Education: Prof. Iwona Skoczko, DSc, Eng.

Academic profile 
Teaching and degrees

Bialystok University of Technology offers 1st degree (Bachelor's or Engineer's), 2nd degree (Master's) and 3rd degree (PhD) studies, postgraduate studies, as well as training and language courses.

Bialystok University of Technology has rights to award PhD degrees of technical sciences in 7 disciplines, PhD degrees of social sciences in 1 discipline and DSc degrees of technical sciences in 5 disciplines.

The university offers various forms of education in English: a double diploma programme, free-mover, student exchange under the Erasmus + programme and a full cycle of education in English, including some interdisciplinary courses.

Staff 

Professors: 175
Teachers (total): 622
Total staff: 1 401

Faculties

Faculty of Architecture 
 Architecture - 1st degree, 2nd degree courses
 Interior Design - 1st degree, 2nd degree courses
 Graphic Arts - 1st degree course
Faculty of Civil Engineering and Environmental Sciences 
 Landscape Architecture - 1st degree, 2nd degree courses
 Civil Engineering - 1st degree, 2nd degree courses
 Environmental Engineering - 1st degree, 2nd degree courses
Biotechnology - 1st degree, 2nd degree courses
Urban Planning - 1st degree, 2nd degree courses
Engineering in Thermal Energetics – 1st degree course
Agri-food Engineering – 1st degree course
Agri-food and Forestry Engineering – 2nd degree course
Forestry Engineering – 1st degree, 2nd degree courses
BIM – Building Information Modeling – 2nd degree course
Faculty of Computer Science
 Computer Science - 1st degree, 2nd degree courses
 Applied Mathematics - 1st degree, 2nd degree courses
 Computer science and Econometrics - 1st degree course
Faculty of Electrical Engineering
 Electronics and Telecommunications - 1st degree, 2nd degree courses
Electrotechnics - 1st degree, 2nd degree courses
Ecoenergetics - 1st degree courses
Electrotechnics – dual studies, 1st degree course
 Faculty of Engineering Management 
 Management - 1st degree, 2nd degree courses
Management and Production Engineering - 1st degree, 2nd degree courses
Management and Service Engineering - 1st degree course
Furniture Engineering - 1st degree course
Tourism And Recreation - 1st degree course
 Faculty of Mechanical Engineering
 Automatic Control and Robotics - 1st degree, 2nd degree courses
Biomedical Engineering - 1st degree, 2nd degree courses
Mechatronics - 1st degree, 2nd degree courses
Mechanics and machine design - 1st degree, 2nd degree courses
Materials and manufacturing engineering - 1st degree course

PhD and DSC degrees of technical sciences (conducted in Polish or English):
 Architecture and Urban Planning - PhD
Automation, Electronic and Electrical Engineering - PhD and DSc
Information and Communication Technology - PhD and Dsc
Biomedical Engineering - PhD
Civil Engineering and Transport - PhD and DSc
Mechanical Engineering - PhD, DSc
Environmental Engineering, Mining and Energy - PhD and DSc

PhD degrees of social sciences (conducted in Polish or English):
 Management and Quality Studies - PhD

First and Second degree courses conducted in English:
 Architecture - 2nd degree course
Interior Design - 2nd degree course
Civil Engineering - 1st and 2nd degree courses
Environmental Engineering - 1st and 2nd degree courses
Electronics and Telecommunications - 2nd degree course
Automatic Control and Robotics - 1st and 2nd degree course 
Logisitcs - 2nd degree course
Management: Smart and Innovative Business - 2nd degree course
Mechatronics - 1st and 2nd degree courses

Institutions and facilities

Foreign Language Centre
Centre for Modern Education
Academic Sport Centre
Doctoral School of the Bialystok University of Technology 
General Education Secondary School of Bialystok University of Technology
Research and Education Centre of the Faculty of Electrical Engineering
INNO-EKO-TECH Innovative Research and Education Centre for Alternative Energy Sources
Energy-efficient Construction and Environmental Protection, and the Scientific and Research
Scientific and Research Centre of Faculty of Forestry in Hajnowka
Diamond Discoverers’ Association
Foundation for the Development of Bialystok University of Technology
Children’ s University of Bialystok University of Technology
Institute of Innovation and Technology of Bialystok University of Technology
Confucius Classroom, Centre for Polish-Chinese Cooperation 
BIAMAN Municipal Computer Network
Akadera Radio Station 87.7 FM
PLATON HD TV of Bialystok University of Technology
GWINT Club
Halls of Residence at the campus of  Bialystok University of Technology

References

External links
 Bialystok University Of Technology - official site
 Faculty of Architecture, Bialystok University of Technology
 Faculty of Civil Engineering and Environmental Sciences, Bialystok University of Technology
 Faculty of Electrical Engineering, Bialystok University of Technology
 Faculty of Computer Science, Bialystok University of Technology
 Faculty of Engineering Management, Bialystok University of Technology
 Faculty of Mechanical Engineering, Bialystok University of Technology
International Relations Office of BUT
Doctoral School of the Bialystok University of Technology
Confucius Classroom, Centre for Polish-Chinese Cooperation

Bialystok University of Technology
Universities and colleges in Poland
Educational institutions established in 1949
1949 establishments in Poland